Shoreline North/185th station is a future Link light rail station on the Lynnwood Link Extension serving Shoreline, Washington. The station will be located in a trench on the east side of Interstate 5, on the north side of Northeast 185th Street. It will include an adjacent bus station and parking garage with 500 stalls. The station is scheduled to open in 2024, with the rest of the line.

History

The Shoreline area developed as a suburban bedroom community in the early 20th century, centering around the Seattle–Everett Interurban Railway and later State Highway 99 on Aurora Avenue. The area east of Aurora Avenue had one major commercial center, North City, which developed in the 1940s along 15th Avenue Northeast. Interstate 5 was constructed through the area between Aurora and North City in the early 1960s, roughly along 5th Avenue Northeast. In 1957, the Seattle Transit Commission proposed using the freeway's right of way for a rapid rail transit system, including a stop at "Richmond" near NE 185th Street. The proposal was rejected by the state government over financing concerns, as federal and state highway funds could not be used for the necessary property acquisition.

Planning for a modern light rail system was delegated to the Transit Commission's successor, Metro Transit, in the 1970s. Although the Interstate 5 corridor was left out of the Forward Thrust proposals, put to two votes in 1968 and 1970 that ultimately failed, it was reconsidered in a 1986 proposal by Metro and the Puget Sound Council of Governments, which placed a station serving North City at NE 185th Street. The proposal was never formally adopted, but was the basis for later proposals by the Regional Transit Agency, which later became Sound Transit. In 1995, the RTA proposed the construction of a regional light rail system, including a line from Seattle to Lynnwood that stopped at 175th Street NE in Shoreline. The plan was rejected by voters and re-sized into a successful 1996 ballot measure, which only constructed light rail from the University of Washington campus in Seattle to Seattle–Tacoma International Airport.

Public involvement in planning
A community group recognized by Shoreline, called 185th Station-Area Citizens Committee (185SCC) was formed in 2012. The formal planning process in Shoreline started in May 2013.

Public involvement has not always been orderly. At a March 2015 public forum in Shoreline on rezoning, the city's mayor threatened to have rowdy, shouting participants ejected by police.

Station layout

Shoreline North/185th station will consist of a single island platform situated below street level in a trench. The station will have two sets of stairs, escalators and elevators leading to enclosed surface entrances with ticket vending machines and rider information. To the immediate east of the station will be a bus station with multiple bays, as well as a kiss and ride facility, atop a 500-stall parking garage. The parking garage was originally planned to be on the west side of the freeway, connected by an enlarged overpass, but was consolidated to save costs.

Services

In addition to Link light rail service, Shoreline North/185th station is planned to become the southern terminus of Community Transit's Swift Blue Line, a bus rapid transit service on the Highway 99 corridor in Snohomish County.

References

External links
Lynnwood Link Extension page

Future Link light rail stations
Link light rail stations in King County, Washington
Shoreline, Washington
Railway stations scheduled to open in 2024